The 2007 US Open was a darts tournament, organised by the Professional Darts Corporation (PDC). It was the inaugural event and played in Connecticut between May 18 and May 20.

The tournament replaced the World Series of Darts which ran for one year and was cancelled as a result of poor television ratings on ESPN. The first US Open was held at the Mohegan Sun Casino Resort, Connecticut, USA – which was the venue used for the 2006 World Series of Darts.

Phil Taylor added to his list of titles by winning the event – beating Raymond van Barneveld in the final.

Television coverage and format
The tournament was broadcast live in the UK on satellite station Challenge. The coverage was hosted by Sarah Cawood and Tony Green, who was broadcasting from a PDC tournament for the first time. Limited coverage of the event was shown on US sport channel Versus.

The format saw 32 boards in action on Friday Night, for "Friday Night Madness" where a minimum of 16 American players progressed to the final stages. On Saturday, the 16 US qualifiers join the top 64 in the PDC Order of Merit (who have entered). Matches were the best of five sets, with three legs per set. The players were whittled down to sixteen for the final stages on Sunday.

Results
The first four rounds were played on Saturday May 19 over the best of five sets (best of three legs per set).

Last 32

Prize fund
Total Prize Fund £126,000 

Winner: £12,500 
Runner-up: £7,500 
Semi-finalists: £5,000 
Quarter-finalists: £4,000 
Last 16: £3,000 
Last 32: £1,500 
Last 64: £1,000

External links
Planet Darts Results and review

US Open (darts)